2204 Lyyli is a dark asteroid and very eccentric Mars-crosser from the middle region of the asteroid belt, approximately  in diameter. It was discovered on 3 March 1943 by Finnish astronomer Yrjö Väisälä at Turku Observatory in Southwest Finland.

Orbit and classification 

Lyyli orbits the Sun in the central main-belt at a distance of 1.5–3.6 AU once every 4 years and 2 months (1,522 days). Its orbit has an eccentricity of 0.41 and an inclination of 21° with respect to the ecliptic.

Naming 

This minor planet was named in honour of Lyyli Heinänen (1903–1988), née Hartonen, a Finnish female Esperantist, professor of mathematics, amateur astronomer and former assistant of the discoverer. The official naming citation was published by the Minor Planet Center on 26 May 1983.

Physical characteristics 

Lyyli is an X-type asteroid in the SMASS classification. It has also been characterized as a P-type asteroid by NASA's NEOWISE mission.

It has a rotation period of 11 hours and a very low albedo between 0.02 and 0.05, according to the surveys carried out by IRAS, Akari, and WISE/NEOWISE. Other large Mars crossing minor planets include 132 Aethra and 323 Brucia, with diameters of 43 and 36 kilometers, respectively.

References

External links 
 Lightcurve plot of 2204 Lyyli, Palmer Divide Observatory, B. D. Warner (2010)
 Lightcurve Database Query (LCDB), at www.minorplanet.info
 Dictionary of Minor Planet Names, Google books
 Asteroids and comets rotation curves, CdR – Geneva Observatory, Raoul Behrend
 Discovery Circumstances: Numbered Minor Planets (1)-(5000) – Minor Planet Center
 
 

002204
Discoveries by Yrjö Väisälä
Named minor planets
19430303